Prasophyllum keltonii, commonly known as Kelton's leek orchid, is a species of orchid endemic to a small region of New South Wales. It has a single tubular, bright green leaf and up to twenty two scented, green, brownish-red or purplish flowers. It is a very rare orchid with only a few hundred plants known.

Description
The flowers are green, brownish-red or purplish and as with others in the genus, are inverted so that the labellum is above the column rather than below it. The edges of the labellum are smooth and there is a broad, green to reddish callus in its centre. Flowering occurs in December and January.

Taxonomy and naming
Prasophyllum keltonii was first formally described in 2007 by David Jones and the description was published in The Orchadian from a specimen collected on McPhersons Plain in the Bago State Forest near Blowering. The specific epithet (keltonii) honours Peter Branwhite, one of the collectors of the type specimen.

Distribution and habitat
Branwhite's leek orchid grows with tall sphagnum moss and heath on a small treeless area known as McPhersons Plain near Cabramurra and Talbingo.

Conservation
Prasophyllum Branwhite is listed as "Critically Endangered" under the Commonwealth Government Environment Protection and Biodiversity Conservation Act 1999 (EPBC) Act and the New South Wales Threatened Species Conservation Act 1995. The main threats to the population are logging, changes in drainage patterns due to dam water storage, grazing by livestock, feral horses and pigs and weed invasion. The population is not in a conservation reserve.

References

External links 
 

Branwhite
Flora of New South Wales
Endemic orchids of Australia
Plants described in 2007